KMO may refer to:
 Knowledge Master Open, a semiannual worldwide academic competition
 Korean Mathematical Olympiad, a competition in South Korea
 KMO (gene), which encodes the enzyme kynurenine 3-monooxygenase
 Manokotak Airport, a state-owned airport in Alaska, IATA code KMO